Plains Airport  is a county-owned public-use airport located one nautical mile (1.85 km) northwest of the central business district of Plains, in Sanders County, Montana, United States. According to the FAA's National Plan of Integrated Airport Systems for 2009–2013, it is categorized as a general aviation facility.

Facilities and aircraft 
It has one runway designated 13/31 with an asphalt surface measuring 4,650 by 75 feet (1,417 x 23 m).

For the 12-month period ending July 22, 2008, the airport had 3,900 general aviation aircraft operations, an average of 10 per day. At that time there were 3 aircraft based at this airport, all single-engine.

References

External links 
 1995 USGS aerial photo showing old runway 12/30
 

Airports in Montana
Buildings and structures in Sanders County, Montana
Transportation in Sanders County, Montana